Charles Joseph Loring Jr. (October 2, 1918 – November 22, 1952) was a fighter pilot in the United States Army Air Forces in World War II, and later in the United States Air Force in the Korean War. Loring rose to the rank of major and posthumously received the Medal of Honor for his heroic actions on November 22, 1952, above Kunwha, Korea during a close air support mission.

Born in Portland, Maine, Loring joined the United States Army in 1942 and was quickly selected to undergo pilot training. He spent several months stationed in Puerto Rico before being transferred to duty in the United Kingdom in 1944. There, he flew 55 combat missions in P-47 Thunderbolt aircraft before being shot down and serving six months as a Nazi German prisoner of war. By the outset of the Korean War, Loring was working in an administrative role in the United States, but by 1952 had been transferred to combat duty in Korea.

During a patrol on November 22, 1952, Loring was leading a flight of F-80 Shooting Stars of the 80th Fighter-Bomber Squadron in an attack on a Chinese artillery position. During the run, his aircraft was struck by intense and accurate anti aircraft fire. Rather than abort the mission, Loring continued his diving run, aiming his disabled aircraft at the position and obliterating it, killing himself in the process. After his death, Loring was awarded the Medal of Honor and made the namesake of Loring Air Force Base in Limestone, Maine.

Early life
Charles Loring Jr. was born on October 2, 1918, in Portland, Maine to Charles J. Loring Sr. and Irene Cronin Loring. He lived in the town throughout his early life, attending Cheverus High School, and graduating in 1937.

Military service

World War II
After the United States entry into World War II, Loring enlisted in the U.S. Army at Portland, at age 23. in March 1942, and as a private joined the Army Air Corps. By May 1942, he had been selected as an aviation cadet at the USAAC pre-flight school at Maxwell Air Force Base in Montgomery, Alabama. Loring completed Primary flight training at Douglas, GA, Basic at Greenville, Mississippi and Advanced at Napier Field, Alabama. After graduating, Loring was commissioned as a second lieutenant in the Army Reserve with a pilot rating.

In December 1942, Loring was assigned to the 22nd Fighter Squadron, 36th Fighter Group, Ninth Air Force at Losey Army Airfield in Juana Díaz, Puerto Rico. The unit flew anti-submarine patrols as part of a force defending the Panama Canal and Caribbean Sea areas. During this time, Loring primarily flew P-39 Airacobra and P-40 Warhawk fighter and ground attack aircraft. After a stint of this duty, the 36th Fighter Group returned to the United States to Charleston Army Airfield in Charleston, South Carolina. There, Loring and the other pilots of the unit trained with the P-47 Thunderbolt aircraft. It briefly moved to Scribner, Nebraska as part of this flight training.

In April 1944, Loring and the group moved to England to fly missions against Nazi German targets. The 36th Fighter Group flew out of RAF Kingsnorth in Kent, England flying reconnaissance, fighter escort and interdiction missions. The missions involved striking military strongpoints in northern Europe in preparation for Operation Overlord. Following the success of Overlord, Loring continued to fly air support missions for the remainder of the conflict. By December, he had flown 55 combat missions. He had been awarded a Distinguished Flying Cross for his actions under fire on June 12, 1944, that destroyed ten enemy armored vehicles in the area of Coutances, France while on a dive-bombing mission.

Prisoner of war
On December 24, 1944, Loring was flying a mission over Belgium when his P-47 was hit by flak artillery as he strafed ground targets. Loring was subsequently captured and spent six months as a German prisoner of war. Loring was liberated on May 5, 1945, three days before the end of the war on May 8, 1945 (V-E Day).

After World War II, Loring remained in the U.S. Army Air Corps. Promoted to captain, he served in a number of administrative roles in the post-war Air Corps, which became the United States Air Force in 1947.

Korean War
By the outbreak of the Korean War in June 1950, Loring was attached to Air University and was not immediately sent to Korea for combat duty. On February 3, 1952, Loring was reassigned to the 2353rd Personnel Processing Squadron at Camp Stoneman in Pittsburg, California. This unit was quickly moved to South Korea, where it was assigned to the 8th Fighter-Bomber Wing, Fifth Air Force, with the assignment of supervising training for replacement pilots before they were moved into combat units. During this time he flew with the 36th Fighter-Bomber Squadron and 80th Fighter-Bomber Squadron, while assisting the new pilots.

In July 1952, Loring transferred to the 36th Fighter-Bomber Squadron full-time, where he served as operations officer. In this role he returned to combat duty, this time as a jet aircraft fighter pilot operating the F-80 Shooting Star. Missions for this unit primarily concerned close air support, air strikes and interdiction missions supporting United Nations Command ground troops in the country. In this role, Loring's unit primarily fought North Korean and Chinese ground targets. By November 22, 1952, Loring had completed 50 combat missions. At that time the ground battle in Korea had developed into a stalemate, with the two sides firmly entrenched along the 38th Parallel. During the battle, the Chinese managed to amass 133 large caliber guns, 24 BM-13 rocket launchers and 47 anti-aircraft guns in the largest Chinese artillery operation during the Korean War, and it posed a serious threat to ground troops of the ROK 2nd Infantry Division operating in the area. The artillery was heavily guarded, forcing the UN forces to use airpower to combat them.

Medal of Honor action and death
Late in the morning of November 22, 1952, Loring led a flight of four F-80s on patrol over Kunwha. Upon radioing a forward air controller, he was told a T-6 Texan flying over Sniper Ridge had spotted a concentration of artillery near the ridge which was pinning down UN ground troops on the ridge. He was also told the artillery concentration was surrounded by a heavy presence of anti-aircraft guns. Loring ordered the flight to the location, spotting the artillery concentration. Immediately after Loring began his dive bombing run, he was spotted by the anti-aircraft batteries. The Chinese crews operating them were highly skilled, and even at a distance, the batteries fired an extremely accurate barrage which struck Loring's aircraft several times on the nose and fuselage. The fire disabled the aircraft. His wingmen, noting the damage, suggested he abort the bombing mission, as the flight was not far behind the lines and Loring's aircraft could have attempted the return trip. Instead, Loring ceased radio contact, and resumed what appeared to be the standard bombing mission. At , however, Loring accelerated his aircraft at a 40-degree angle in what appeared to be a controlled maneuver, lining up the Chinese batteries. The other pilots reported they watched, stunned, as Loring dove his damaged aircraft into the battery position. Loring was killed instantly in the impact, but his action resulted in the complete destruction of the battery position.

Loring's remains were never recovered after the crash and he was listed as "Missing in action, presumed dead."

Honors
On May 5, 1954, Loring's widow received a Medal of Honor from President Dwight Eisenhower. At that time, it was also announced that the newly built Air Force Base in Limestone, Maine would be named Loring Air Force Base in his honor.

In 2000, "Loring Memorial Park" was dedicated for Major Loring in Portland, Maine in the Munjoy Hill neighborhood.

Cheverus High School (named in 1924 after the first Roman Catholic bishop of the Boston Diocese) where Loring had graduated from in 1937, created a display in its alumni room dedicated to Major Loring. The display featured replicas of Loring's medals, as well as his high school diploma. The school also created a school award named after him which honors students who have served in the U.S. military.

The Amvets Charles J. Loring Post 25 in Portland, Maine is named after Major Loring.

The combined enlisted/officer club at Kunsan AB, South Korea is named in his honor.

Military awards
Loring's military awards and decorations include:

Medal of Honor citation
Loring was one of four U.S. Air Force Medal of Honor recipients of the Korean War. All four were pilots who were killed in action. They were the only U.S. Air Force members to receive the Army version of the medal (the USAF version was first awarded during the Vietnam War). His Medal of Honor citation reads as follows.

See also 

List of Medal of Honor recipients
List of Korean War Medal of Honor recipients
George A. Davis Jr., USAF-M0H
Louis J. Sebille, USAF-MOH
John S. Walmsley Jr., USAF-MOH

Citations

References

Sources

External links

1918 births
1952 deaths
United States Air Force Medal of Honor recipients
American prisoners of war in World War II
American military personnel killed in the Korean War
United States Air Force personnel of the Korean War
United States Air Force officers
Military personnel missing in action
Aviators from Maine
Aviators killed by being shot down
World War II prisoners of war held by Germany
United States Army Air Forces pilots of World War II
United States Army Air Forces officers
Recipients of the Air Medal
Recipients of the Croix de guerre (Belgium)
Recipients of the Distinguished Flying Cross (United States)
Korean War recipients of the Medal of Honor
Loring Air Force Base
Military personnel from Portland, Maine
Cheverus High School alumni